Midsummer Night's Fire or St. John's Fire is a 1939 German drama film directed by Arthur Maria Rabenalt and starring Anna Dammann, Ernst von Klipstein, and Gertrud Meyen. The film is based on the play Fires of St. John by Hermann Sudermann. The title refers to Saint John's Eve.

Location shooting took place in Prenzlau and around Masuria in East Prussia. It was remade in 1954 as Love is Forever.

Plot
After many years in Africa, a man returns to his village in East Prussia to marry his intended bride. However, he finds himself drawn to another girl and contemplates running away with her.

Cast

References

External links

Films of Nazi Germany
German drama films
1939 drama films
Films based on works by Hermann Sudermann
Films directed by Arthur Maria Rabenalt
Terra Film films
German black-and-white films
1930s German films
1930s German-language films